The article China's first-level administrative divisions by their gross domestic product per capita in main years. All figures are given in the national currency, renminbi (CNY), and in USD at nominal values according to recent exchange rates as well as according to purchasing power parity (PPP). The average CNY exchange rate used here is from the National Bureau of Statistics of China, and CNY PPP exchange rates are estimated according to the International Monetary Fund (IMF).

Since the implementation of reform and opening up in mainland China in 1978, its economy has developed rapidly. In 1995, the GDP per capita of Beijing, Tianjin and Shanghai reached more than 1,000 US dollars; by 2000, there were 10 provinces with GDP per capita exceeding 1,000 US dollars, of which Beijing, Tianjin and Shanghai exceeded 2,000 US dollars. By 2020, the per capita GDP of mainland China exceeded US$10,000, of which Beijing and Shanghai exceeded US$22,000, Jiangsu was nearly US$18,000, Fujian exceeded US$15,000, Zhejiang and Tianjin exceeded US$14,000, Guangdong and Chongqing exceeded US$11,000 and Hubei, Inner Mongolia and Shandong exceeded US$10,000. Except for Gansu, the remaining provinces all exceeded US$6,000.

For comparison purposes, this article also displays the GDPs the special administrative regions (SARs) of Hong Kong and Macau, which maintain separate economic systems and currencies. These figures are shown in USD based on PPP, as estimated by the International Monetary Fund.

2021 map

2021 data

2020 data

Appendix

See also 

 Economy of China
 Historical GDP of China
 List of Chinese administrative divisions by GDP
 List of Chinese prefecture-level cities by GDP per capita
 List of prefecture-level cities by GDP per capita
 List of renminbi exchange rates
 List of country subdivisions by GDP over 200 billion US dollars

Notes 
 All the comparative data for Chinese Yuan Renminbi is based on World Economic Outlook Database of the International Monetary Fund.
 Mainland China figures were calculated by dividing figures in the list of Chinese administrative divisions by GDP by figures in the list of Chinese administrative divisions by population.

Sources
 GDP 2004-2010 figures: NBS GDP DATA – Revisions of China GDP 2004-2008 by province-level divisions
 GDP 1978-2003 figures: NBS GDP DATA – Revisions of China GDP 1978-2003 by province-level divisions
 GDP 1952-1977 figures: NBS GDP DATA – Revisions of China GDP 1952-1977 by province-level divisions

References

External links
 China National Bureau of Statistics (China NBS)
 Hong Kong Census and Statistics Department
 Macau Statistics and Census Service
 ROC Directorate-General of Budget, Accounting and Statistics

GDP per capita
GDP per capita
GDP per capita
Chinese administrative divisions by GDP per capita
Economy of China-related lists
China, GDP per capita